Christian Stangl (born July 10, 1966 in Landl, Austria) is an Austrian alpine style mountaineer and mountain guide. He has become known as Skyrunner by numerous exceptionally fast ascents of high mountains. His major success was in 2013, when he became the first person to ascend the three highest mountains on all seven continents, the so-called Triple Seven Summits.

On January 15, 2013, he was the first person to ascent the Seven Second Summits, the second highest peaks of all seven continents.
On August 23, 2013, after climbing Shkhara (5193m), he became the first person to have reached the third highest peaks on all seven continents. Because of measurement and definition issues Stangl climbed 30 peaks instead of only 21 to avoid any inaccuracy and misconception. On September 17, 2013, his achievement was certified by Guinness World Records in London.

Early career 
Christian Stangl was born in 1966 in Landl (Styria), in the east of the Gesäuse National Park. After finishing school, he completed his education as an electrical engineer in a Higher Technical Institute. When he was 16, he began climbing and ventured into solo climbing, speed climbing, enchainment and winter climbing in the Alps.

In 1990, he began high-altitude mountaineering in the Andes and the Himalaya. In 1991, during an attempt to climb a new route in the south wall of the 7285m high Baintha Brakk, he was seriously injured in an avalanche. In 1998, Stangl reached the Shishapangma, his first 8000er via the southwest face, the so-called "British Route".

In 1995, Stangl started speed climbing ("skyrunning") the high Andes peaks. In the following years he succeeded in his first series of skyruns, reaching nine 6000ers within 18 days. Over the next few years, he successfully completed several other challenges in the Andes: Ten 6000ers within 7 days (2005), three 6000ers within one day (2006), and four 6000ers within one day (2008).

Seven summits speed climbing 

In 2001, he succeeded in a solo climb of Cho Oyu. At 7000m his new route meets the 1954 Tichy-Route.

In 2005 he did ABC (Tibet) to the top in 16 hours and 42 minutes in 2005, in league with the fastest times for this type of route.

In 2008, Stangl became famous after completing his speed climbing series of the Seven Summits. For  reaching all seven summits it took him 58 hours and 45 minutes.

Specific times for single ascents:
 Mount Everest: 16:42
 Aconcagua: 4:25
 Denali: 16:45
 Elbrus: 5:18
 Kilimanjaro: 5:36
 Mount Vinson: 9:10
 Carstensz Pyramid: 0:49

At the same time, he set new records for climbing Aconcagua, Elbrus, Mount Vinson and Carstensz Pyramid. The film The Skyrunner (2007) deals with Stangl's 49-minute record ascent of the Carstensz Pyramid.

Second Seven Summits 
As a continuation of the Seven Summits speed-project Stangl pursued the goal of skyrunning up the second highest peaks of each continent, the so-called Seven Second Summits, with the vision of being the first person to complete the Seven Summits as well as the Seven Second Summits. In 2008, Stangl undertook his first expedition to K2, the second highest mountain of Asia (8611m). After the death of 11 mountaineers in an ice avalanche at the Bottleneck (approx. 8200m), Stangl, as well as most of the other mountaineers, aborted the expedition (see 2008 K2 disaster). In the same year, Stangl took part in an extensive Antarctica expedition and went up Mount Vinson, Mount Shinn and Mount Gardner again, and attempted to climb the north face of Mount Tyree.

In 2009, he managed to ascent Mount Kenya (Batian peak) (5199m) in Africa and Dychtau (5224m) in the Caucasus region. Besides, he made a second summit attempt of K2 as part of an international team. At about 8300m, waist-deep snow prevented their success.

In 2010, Stangl climbed Puncak Trikora (4730m) in Oceania. He then ascended the second highest peak in North America, the 5959m high Mount Logan in Canada, and subsequently went to the Karakoram in order to climb K2. On August 10, he started another summit attempt from the basecamp. On August 12, he stated to have reached the summit. Shortly after, people raised doubts about his account. At a press conference, on September 12, he admitted that he did not actually reach the summit of K2. This sparked off a big scandal in German-speaking media.

In January 2013, Stangl finally succeeded in climbing all Second Seven Summits.

Triple Seven Summits 

In the aftermath of K2-scandal, Stangl underwent a fundamental change of mindset and stayed out of the limelight. Nevertheless, after an interruption of his mountaineering activities, he continued to climb the peaks of the seven continents. He expanded his plan of climbing the Seven Second Summits and planned to become the first person to ever climb the three highest mountains of each continent, the so-called Triple Seven Summits. This made him turn away from speed climbing. Now, to be more effective, he put emphasis on precise documentation of his activities, using photos, videos, and GPS tracking. In Spring 2011, Stangl cycled from the Indian ocean to the Himalayas on a simple military bicycle, then walked for 11 days to the base camp of Kangchenjunga (8586m) and then, after a total of 76 days, reached the summit of the third highest mountain of Asia. In summer 2011, he went to K2 again, but as in the years before, since 2008, also in this season, not a single climber could reach the summit on the Pakistani side of the mountain.

For the end of 2011, Stangl planned an expedition to Mount Tyree (4852m) to climb the second highest mountain of Antarctica. As for Stangl, climbing the Seven Second Summits became a milestone along the way climbling the world's 21 highest mountains. He invited his competitor from South Tyrol, Hans Kammerlander to climb Mount Tyree with him. On January 3, 2012, all three expedition members, Stangl, Kammerlander and the Austrian Robert Miller reached the peak of Mount Tyree via the east wall and the northeast ridge.

In the summer of 2012, Stangl started a new expedition to K2 at which the conditions were considerably better than in the years before. Late in the evening of July 12, Stangl and his fellow polish climber Adam Bielecki, started their crucial ascent from base camp III (7400m) and reached the peak of the second highest mountain in the world at around 16:00. The climbers completed the climb successfully without any bottled oxygen and returned to base camp III 23 hours later.
After the success of ascending K2, Stangl was now able to concentrate on the outstanding mountains of his Triple Seven Summits project. In January 2013, Stangl climbed Sumantri (4870m) in Oceania, as well as the three highest mountains of mainland Australia, Mount Kosciuszko (2228m), Mount Townsend (2209m), and Mount Twynam (2195m) in the Snowy Mountains and in New South Wales, in order to ascend the highest peaks according to the Bass list. For the completion of the project, Stangl travelled to the Kaukasus region to climb the 5193m high Shkara via the south face on August 23, 2013, together with the Georgian Archil Badriashvili and the Austrian Michael Haidn. The third highest mountain in Europe was the last of the Triple Seven Summits.

Subsequently, Stangl's success was approved by the chronicler Eberhard Jurgalski, the expert commission of the Guinness World Records and numerous other alpine journalists.

The Guinness World Records awarded Stangl three Alpine records:
 The first person to successfully climb the "Triple Seven Summits" (within seven years – Mount Everest 2006 – Shkhara 2013)
 The first person to successfully climb the "Seven Second Summits" (within six years – Ojos del Salado 2007 – Sumantri 2013)
 The first person to successfully climb the "Seven Third Summits" (within five years – Mount Shinn 2008 – Shkhara 2013)

Table of the Triple Seven Summits 

The table shows the key data of the ascents of the Triple Seven Summits project. It is mainly based upon a list of Eberhard Jurgalski, created 2013. The numbering shows more than the actual 21 mountains, acknowledging two different lists of alpinistic tradition, the Bass version (B), and more challenging Messner version (M).

In addition to the 21 mountains of the Messner version, Stangl ascended further nine summits on three continents to also meet the requirements of the Bass version. This includes ascending the three highest peaks of Australian mainland Mount Ksciuszko, Mount Townsend and Mount Twynam. In course of the project, he anew climbed the three highest peaks of the Alps, Mont Blanc (4,810 m), Dufourspitze (4,634 m), and Dom (4,545 m), in 2013. According to one of multiple acknowledged scholarly opinions, the border between Europe and Asia is to be located north of Caucasus, alongside the Kuma–Manych Depression. Considering that, the Alps would be the highest mountain range of Europe, making Mont Blanc, Dufourspitze and Dom the highest summits of the continent. Due to potential uncertainties regarding the measurement accuracy of altitudes, Stangl also climbed three additional mountains, Ngga Pulu (2007) und Puncak Trikora (2010) in Oceania, and Rwenzori (Margherita Peak) in Africa (2012).

Further ventures / personal life 
Since younger days, Christian Stangl undertakes extended bicycle treks. In 1985, he cycled across the Alps in 28 days, climbing Matterhorn, Mont Blanc, Eiger, Piz Palü, Cevedale, Königsspitze, and Ortler, on the way. In 2005, he traversed Atacama desert solo, north to south, covering a distance of 900 kilometers. For training matters, Stangl goes for long bicycle treks, for instance cycling from Admont to Gibraltar within 21 days, in 2001. In course of the Triple Seven Summits project, he rode from Austria to Caucasus and back, carrying the entire expedition luggage.

In 2022, Christian Stangl was able to reach Alma Negra (6,110 m) in Argentina on a new route from the South in a solo ascend.

Christian Stangl now lives in Hall bei Admont, and works as state-approved mountain guide and project manager. He gives speeches and does presentations about his mountaineering ventures, and holds special workshops for executives.

Books

References

External links
 www.skyrunning.at Stangl's website
 bergfuehrer-stangl.com Stangl's mountain guide website (German)
 The Skyrunner European Outdoor Film Tour 2007/08

1966 births
Living people
Austrian mountain climbers
Austrian summiters of Mount Everest